Thomas James "Jay" Feely (born May 23, 1976) is a former American football placekicker and current sportscaster. He started his career with the Florida Bobcats in the Arena Football League as a street free agent in 1999 before playing for several NFL teams. Since his retirement, Feely has worked as a reporter and analyst for CBS/Turner Sports.

Feely was a member of the Tampa Bay Storm, Atlanta Falcons, New York Giants, Miami Dolphins, Kansas City Chiefs, New York Jets, Arizona Cardinals, and Chicago Bears. He was a member of the Pro Football Weekly All-Rookie Team with the Falcons in 2001 and was a Pro Bowl alternate with the Giants in 2005. He played college football at Michigan.

Early years
Feely attended Jesuit High School in Tampa, Florida. While there, he set Hillsborough County career and season records for field goals and extra points. Feely played for the Temple Terrace Spirit Soccer team that won the National Championships when he was 16 years old.

College career
Feely was a four-year letterman at the University of Michigan from 1995 to 1998. As a senior in 1998, he converted 17 of 22 field goal attempts and 40 of 41 point-after attempts on his way to a mention for the All-Big Ten team. His longest career field goal was 51-yard kick against Baylor as a junior. He finished his career 20-for-26 in field goals and 43-for-44 in extra points.

Professional career

Florida Bobcats
After going undrafted in the 1999 NFL Draft, Feely kicked for the Florida Bobcats of the Arena Football League. That season, he went 2-for-5 in field goal attempts and 8-for-13 in extra point attempts. He added three tackles (two solo) and forced a fumble.

Tampa Bay Storm
Feely kicked for the Tampa Bay Storm in 2000, converting one of six field goal attempts and three of four extra point attempts. He returned one kickoff for 22 yards.

Atlanta Falcons
In March 2001, Feely worked out for the Washington Redskins but was not signed. On April 12, he signed a one-year, $209,000 contract with the Atlanta Falcons. Although Jake Arians had been expected to be the Falcons' placekicker during the 2001 season, Feely won the job.

As a rookie with the Falcons in 2001, Feely converted 29 of 37 field goal attempts (78.4%) and all 28 extra point attempts. He also converted 14 of 15 field goals away from the Georgia Dome. His 115 points tied him with the Eagles' David Akers for second in the NFC, behind only Rams kicker Jeff Wilkins. Feely converted a 55-yard attempt against the Arizona Cardinals on September 30. He also caught one pass for -2 yards from Falcons punter Chris Mohr on a fake field goal attempt. For his performance during the season, Feely was a consensus all-rookie selection.

An exclusive-rights free agent in the 2002 offseason, Feely was tendered a one-year, $300,000 contract by the Falcons on February 22. He signed the deal on June 7. That season, he converted 32 of 40 field goal attempts (80 percent) and all but one of 43 extra point attempts. His 32 field goals tied him with Tampa Bay Buccaneers kicker Martín Gramática for most in the NFL. It also broke Morten Andersen's previous franchise record of 31 set in 1995. Feely earned NFL Special Teams Player of the Week honors after converting three field goals of more than 40 yards against the Carolina Panthers on October 20, and eventually earned NFC Special Teams Player of the Month honors for converting 9 of 10 field goals and all nine points after touchdowns. In 2003, Feely converted 19 of 27 field goal attempts (70.4 percent) and 32 of 33 extra point attempts.

On March 6, 2004, the Falcons re-signed Feely – a restricted free agent – to a one-year contract worth $628,000. That season, he achieved a field goal percentage of 78.3 by converting 18 of 23 tries. He connected on all 40 of his extra point attempts that season. On September 19 against the St. Louis Rams, he recovered his own onside kick. In two playoff games, Feely was a perfect 2-for-2 in field goals and 7-for-7 on PATs.

New York Giants
An unrestricted free agent in the 2005 offseason, Feely signed a three-year deal with the New York Giants on March 12. The contract included base salaries of $540,000 (2005), $545,000 (2006) and $550,000 (2007). In a preseason game against the New York Jets that year, Feely scored all his team's points in a 15–14 victory by connecting on five field goals, including two over 50 yards. In week 12 in 2005 at the Seahawks however, Feely failed to connect on 3 consecutive potential game-winning field goals, and the Giants lost 24-21 despite compiling 490 yards total offense. The Giants ended up in a wild-card playoff game where they lost to Carolina. Feely broke the New York Giants franchise record for best field goal percentage over a two-year period. He had an 83% followed by an 85% year while with the Giants.

Miami Dolphins
As a free agent in the 2007 offseason, the Miami Dolphins signed Feely to a three-year contract worth just under $5 million on March 8. The team subsequently traded placekicker Olindo Mare to the New Orleans Saints on April 3.

During his first season with the Dolphins, experienced the most productive season of his career and in franchise history. He missed just two of his 23 field goal attempts, setting a new franchise record for field goal percentage at 91.3. The record had previously been 90.5 percent by Mare in 2001. Through the 2007 season, Feely had converted 164 straight extra point attempts and had created five recovered onside kicks.

During the 2008 offseason, it was reported that new Dolphins Vice President Bill Parcells did not like Feely's outspoken nature and that he would not be assured a roster spot despite his 2007 success. The Dolphins released fellow kicker Dave Rayner on June 6, leaving only undrafted rookie Dan Carpenter (Montana) to challenge Feely for the team's placekicking job in 2008. He was released by the Dolphins on August 12, 2008.

Kansas City Chiefs
On August 25, 2008, Feely was signed by the Kansas City Chiefs, and released one day later.

New York Jets
After New York Jets kicker Mike Nugent was injured in the team's Week 1 contest against the Miami Dolphins, they signed Feely on September 8, 2008. On November 13, Feely kicked a game-winning 34-yard field goal in overtime against the New England Patriots; the Jets took sole possession of first place in the AFC East for the first time since November 19, 2001.

Through 10 games, Feely had made 16 of his 20 field goal attempts (80.0%), with an average of 35.1 yards and a long of 55 yards and converted all 23 PATs for a total of 71 points. Feely reportedly began working out his upper body five days a week in the Jets new training facility, saying, "I work out hard in the weight room just so I don't get injured." His workout primarily centered on deadlifts.

On March 4, 2009, Feely re-signed a one-year contract with the Jets.

In Week Six of the 2009 season against the Buffalo Bills, Feely broke Pat Leahy's record of 23 consecutive field goals, hitting his 24th. However, he missed his next attempt in second-quarter, leaving the team record at 24.

On December 21, 2009, Feely went 0–2 in field goal attempts.  He "shanked" a 38-yard try and had a 37-yarder blocked, as the Jets lost to the Atlanta Falcons 10–7. On January 9, 2010, Feely recorded his first career punt in a playoff game against the Cincinnati Bengals, when he was unexpectedly pressed into service after his teammate Steve Weatherford was sidelined with an irregular heartbeat.

Arizona Cardinals
Feely signed with the Arizona Cardinals on April 2, 2010.
On December 12, 2010, Feely became just the fourth kicker in 40 years to run for a touchdown, scoring on a fake field goal against the Denver Broncos. Feely also kicked a career-high five field goals in the game.
Feely scored 25 points in that game, the most points scored by a player in a single game since October 21, 2007, when Rob Bironas scored 26 against the Houston Texans. On Christmas Day in 2010, Feely kicked a 48-yard field goal for a win over the Dallas Cowboys. On October 14, 2012 in a Week 6 matchup against the Buffalo Bills, Feely hit a 61-yard field goal, setting a new career best. However, in the same game, his 38-yard field goal attempt was deflected with 3 seconds left in the fourth quarter which the Cardinals went on to lose 16–19 in OT. Feely re-signed with the Cardinals for the 2014 season. The Cardinals released Feely on August 25, 2014.

Chicago Bears
The Chicago Bears signed Feely on December 3, 2014 as injury cover for Robbie Gould when he was considered doubtful for the game against the Dallas Cowboys. Feely played the remaining four games of the season for the Chicago Bears, three of which were at Soldier Field.

Career regular season statistics

In the media

Feely appeared on ESPN First Take, and also with his wife Rebecca, on A Baby Story on TLC, which aired January 11, 2006.

After missing three field goals for the Giants in an overtime loss to the Seattle Seahawks in 2005, Feely was the subject of a Saturday Night Live sketch. The NFL Films parody, entitled The Long Ride Home: The Jay Feely Story, featured comedian Dane Cook as Feely on the Giants' five-hour flight home from Seattle, where he is forced to land the plane through two large radio towers that look like field goal posts.

Feely joined the CBS Sports Network in 2015 as a color analyst covering college football. Beginning in 2017, Feely also served as a color commentator for CBS' NFL telecasts, working alongside Beth Mowins, the first full-time female NFL play-by-play announcer. In 2018, he was set to be color analyst with play-by-play partner Mowins on the #8 team of NFL on CBS for Weeks 13 and 17, but he settled for sideline reporter for Weeks 10 and 17 as the #5 announcing team. He also joined neurosurgeon, CNN medical reporter and fellow Michigan alum Sanjay Gupta as a commentator on the Wolverines' TeamCast for the school's appearance in the 2018 NCAA Men's Final Four, airing on TNT. When he is not working as analyst, he is the reporter for the #4 team for the NFL on CBS. In 2021, Feely teamed up with Dedes and started on the #7 team of NFL on CBS for Week 1 while James Lofton was away; Andrew Catalon and Tiki Barber teamed up as the #6 announcing team, and Tom McCarthy and Aaron Taylor teamed up as the #5 announcing team. He and Dedes are now on the #6 team of NFL on CBS for the rest of the 2021 season.

Personal life
A number of Feely's family members have also been involved in sports.  His grandfather, Thomas J. Feely was a college basketball and baseball coach for St. Thomas College in St. Paul, Minnesota from the early 1950s to 1984. He was inducted into the N.A.I.A. National Basketball Hall of Fame both as a coach and as a player.

Feely's father, Thomas J. "T.J." Feely, is a former College of St. Thomas running back and also a tennis coach who owns the Feely Kicking School of Tampa, Florida. Feely enjoys golf and has played with the Mater Dei golf team on multiple occasions.

Feely and his wife, Rebecca, live in Arizona. The couple have four children. Feely is also a close friend of former college teammates, Tom Brady and Desmond Howard.

Feely has appeared on Fox News' Hannity talking about his disagreements with President Barack Obama's policies and whether he is running for president.

In 2011, Feely became a member of School of the Legends and contributes to the organization with instructional videos, which focus on his position as a kicker.

Feely is a supporter of President Donald Trump, and called it an honor to play golf with him on August 15, 2020.

Notes

References

External links

ArenaFan bio
New York Jets bio

1976 births
Living people
Sportspeople from Saint Paul, Minnesota
Sportspeople from Hillsborough County, Florida
People from Odessa, Florida
People from Upper Saddle River, New Jersey
Players of American football from Saint Paul, Minnesota
Players of American football from Florida
American football placekickers
Michigan Wolverines football players
Florida Bobcats players
Tampa Bay Storm players
Atlanta Falcons players
New York Giants players
Miami Dolphins players
Kansas City Chiefs players
New York Jets players
Arizona Cardinals players
Chicago Bears players
Jesuit High School (Tampa) alumni
College football announcers
National Football League announcers